Chueh Ming-Hui (born November 22, 1984) is a Taiwanese softball player. She competed for Chinese Taipei at the 2008 Summer Olympics.

References

Living people
1984 births
Olympic softball players of Taiwan
Taiwanese softball players
Softball players at the 2008 Summer Olympics
Asian Games medalists in softball
Softball players
Softball players at the 2010 Asian Games
Medalists at the 2010 Asian Games
Asian Games bronze medalists for Chinese Taipei
21st-century Taiwanese women